American InterContinental University South Florida Campus was a location of American InterContinental University, a for-profit university, located at 2250 N. Commerce Parkway, Weston, Florida.  The , four-story learning facility featured "modern technology, media equipment, and industry-current learning labs".  The campus was closed in 2015.

External links
  AIU South Florida - former official site

Former for-profit universities and colleges in the United States
2015 disestablishments in Florida
Educational institutions disestablished in 2015